The 1882 Massachusetts gubernatorial election was held on November 7.

Civil War Major and former Congressman Benjamin Butler ran on a fusion ticket between the Democratic Party and the Greenback Labor Party.

Republican nomination

Candidates
William W. Crapo, U.S. Representative from New Bedford
Robert R. Bishop, President of the Massachusetts Senate

Declined
William W. Rice, U.S. Representative from Worcester

Results

General election

Results

Lt. Governor

See also
 1882 Massachusetts legislature

References

Governor
1882
Massachusetts
November 1882 events